Brawley Municipal Airport  is one mile northeast of Brawley, in Imperial County, California, United States.

References

External links 
 
 

Airports in Imperial County, California
Brawley, California